The striped bush squirrel (Paraxerus flavovittis) is a species of rodent in the family Sciuridae found in Kenya, Malawi, Mozambique, and Tanzania. Its natural habitats are moist savanna and plantations.

References

Paraxerus
Mammals described in 1852
Taxa named by Wilhelm Peters
Taxonomy articles created by Polbot